Manáos is an old name for Manaus, a city in Amazonas, Brazil.

Manaos may also refer to:
 Manaos Athletic Club, a defunct football club in Manáos
 Manaos (film), a 1978 Spanish-Italian-Mexican adventure film
 , a soft drink produced by Refres Now S.A.